Charles Sweeney or Sweeny is the name of:

 Charlie Sweeney (1863–1902), American Major League Baseball pitcher
 Charles Sweeny (1882–1963), American soldier of fortune
 Buck Sweeney (1890–1955), American baseball player
 Charles Francis Sweeny (1910–1993), American businessman instrumental in forming the Second World War Eagle Squadrons, nephew of the soldier of fortune
 Charles Sweeney (1919–2004), United States Air Force major general who piloted the bomber that dropped the second atomic bomb in World War II
 Charles Sweeney (judge), 20th century Australian judge - see Federal Court of Bankruptcy for a list of courts over which he presided
 Charles Sweeney, Chief Justice of the High Court of Tuvalu beginning 2016

See also
 Charles Sweeney Cabin, Appomattox Court House National Historical Park, Virginia, United States